Cambodia competed at the 1972 Summer Olympics in Munich, West Germany.  The nation returned to the Olympic Games as the Khmer Republic (1970–1975) after missing the 1968 Summer Olympics. Owing to the troubled situation of the country caused by Khmer Rouge, Cambodia would not compete again until the 1996 Summer Olympics.

Athletics 

Men

Field events

Women

Boxing

Men

Swimming

Men

References
Official Olympic Reports

Nations at the 1972 Summer Olympics
1972
Olympics